Lane End is the name of more than one place.

In the United Kingdom:
Lane End, Bradford
Lane End, Buckinghamshire
Lane End, Cumbria
Lane End, Derbyshire
Lane End, Devon
Lane End, Dorset
Lane End, Kent
Lane End, Hampshire
Lane End, Herefordshire
Lane End, Isle of Wight
Lane End, Staffordshire, a district of Stoke-on-Trent incorporated with Longton, Staffordshire, in 1865.
Lane End, Surrey
Lane End, Wiltshire